Daniel John Mooney (born 3 July 1999) is a professional footballer who plays as a midfielder for Southend United.

Club career
Mooney is a product of the Fleetwood Town Academy. At the beginning of the 2017–18 season he was sent out on loan to Northern Premier League Division One North side Bamber Bridge, where he was in excellent form as the side made a fine start to the season. He left the club in December 2017, subsequently signing a one-month youth loan for National League North side Chorley, having impressed manager, Matt Jansen, when playing against the Magpies for Bamber Bridge in the Lancashire FA Challenge Trophy quarter-final. In February 2018, he signed for Northern Premier League Premier Division side Ashton United on loan. On 9 October 2018 Mooney made his debut for Fleetwood in the starting line up for a 2–0 defeat against Rochdale in the EFL Trophy. In May 2019 Mooney signed a one year contract extension with Fleetwood.

On 4 January 2020, it was announced Mooney had joined National League North side Altrincham for an undisclosed fee. He made his debut the same day, starting in a 5–2 win against Telford.

Mooney joined Southend United on 26 May 2022. "Dan has obvious qualities," said Blues Head Coach Kevin Maher.

International career
Mooney has played for Wales at under-19 and under-21 levels.

Career statistics

Honours
Ashton United
Northern Premier League Premier Division play-offs: 2017–18

References

External links

Living people
1999 births
Wales youth international footballers
Wales under-21 international footballers
Association football forwards
Fleetwood Town F.C. players
Bamber Bridge F.C. players
Chorley F.C. players
Ashton United F.C. players
Chester F.C. players
Altrincham F.C. players
Southend United F.C. players
English Football League players
National League (English football) players
Northern Premier League players